Acanthoceto is a genus of South American anyphaenid sac spiders first described by Cândido Firmino de Mello-Leitão in 1944.

Species
 it contains seven species:
Acanthoceto acupicta (Nicolet, 1849) – Chile, Argentina, Uruguay, Brazil
Acanthoceto cinerea (Tullgren, 1901) – Chile, Argentina
Acanthoceto ladormida Ramírez, 1997 – Chile
Acanthoceto marina Ramírez, 1997 – Chile
Acanthoceto pichi Ramírez, 1997 – Chile, Argentina
Acanthoceto riogrande Ramírez, 1997 – Brazil, Argentina
Acanthoceto septentrionalis (Berland, 1913) – Colombia, Ecuador

References

Anyphaenidae
Araneomorphae genera
Spiders of South America
Taxa named by Cândido Firmino de Mello-Leitão